Salah Majid (born 1932) is an Iraqi Olympic javelin thrower. He represented his country in the men's javelin throw at the 1960 Summer Olympics. His distance was a 57.32 in the qualifiers.

References

Iraqi male javelin throwers
Olympic athletes of Iraq
Athletes (track and field) at the 1960 Summer Olympics
1932 births
Living people